Basic Education High School No. 1 Lanmadaw (commonly known as Lanmadaw 1 High School or St. John's High School), located in Lanmadaw township, is a public high school in Yangon.

The school's main colonial era building is a landmark protected by the city, and is listed on the Yangon City Heritage List.

The first organized football match in Myanmar (then British Burma) was played at its field in 1879. The field is still extant, though the school has been renovated with the passage of time.

References

High schools in Yangon
Educational institutions established in 1861
1861 establishments in Burma
Buildings and structures in Yangon
1861 establishments in the British Empire